Bertia is a genus of air-breathing Asian land snails: they are pulmonate gastropod molluscs in the family Dyakiidae.

Distribution and conservation status

Bertia spp. have been recorded from the tropical forests of Borneo and Indo-China: all with very local distributions.  The species listed below also all appear to be endangered, primarily due to habitat loss but exacerbated by over-collecting.

Species
The World Register of Marine Species lists:
 Bertia cambojiensis (Reeve, 1860)
 Bertia pergrandis (E.A. Smith, 1893)
 Bertia setzeri Thach, 2015

Note: Bertia brookei (Adams & Reeve, 1848) is a synonym of Exrhysota brookei (Adams & Reeve, 1848) (Chronidae).

References

External links

Dyakiidae
Gastropod genera
Taxa named by César Marie Félix Ancey